The black-capped swallow (Atticora pileata) is a species of bird in the family Hirundinidae. It is found in Chiapas, Guatemala, El Salvador and Honduras. Its natural habitats are subtropical or tropical moist montane forests and heavily degraded former forest.

It was first described by John Gould  as Atticora pileata in the Proceedings of the Zoological Society of London.

References

Further reading

black-capped swallow
Birds of Mexico
Birds of Guatemala
Birds of El Salvador
Birds of Honduras
black-capped swallow
Taxonomy articles created by Polbot